Tsukamoto (written: 塚本 or 柄本) is a Japanese surname. Notable people with the surname include:

, Japanese footballer
Ann Tsukamoto (born 1952), American scientist
, Japanese boxer
, Japanese footballer
, Japanese general
, Japanese businessman
, Japanese rower
Mary Tsukamoto (1915–1998), Japanese-American educator, cultural historian, and civil rights activist
, Japanese ballet dancer
, Japanese film director and actor
, Japanese footballer
, Japanese actor, singer and model
, Japanese badminton player

Fictional characters
, a character in the visual novel Comic Party
, a character in the novel series Sound! Euphonium
, a character in the manga series School Rumble
, protagonist of the manga series Days
, a character in the manga series School Rumble

See also
9256 Tsukamoto, a main-belt asteroid
Tsukamoto Station, a railway station in Osaka, Osaka Prefecture, Japan

Japanese-language surnames